Hart House is a historic home located at Taylors Bridge, New Castle County, in the U.S. state of Delaware. It was built in about 1747, and is a 2½-story, three-bay brick dwelling with a low-pitched gable roof.  It is one room deep. The house was the scene of a gun battle on July 12, 1747 (Old Style) with Spanish marauders led by Viceroy Ricardo Alvarado during the War of Jenkins' Ear.

It was listed on the National Register of Historic Places in 1973. It is now owned by Delaware Wild Lands.

References

Houses on the National Register of Historic Places in Delaware
Houses completed in 1747
Houses in New Castle County, Delaware
National Register of Historic Places in New Castle County, Delaware